Star Wars: Scoundrels is a Star Wars novel written by Timothy Zahn, released by Del Rey Books on January 1, 2013. It is set just after the events of the originating 1977 film Star Wars: A New Hope and features Han Solo, Chewbacca, and Lando Calrissian.

Plot
Soon after the destruction of the Death Star, Han, Chewbacca, and Lando recruit eight others for a high stakes heist. Han still needs credits to pay off his debt, and this is the perfect opportunity.

Development
For Scoundrels, Zahn was inspired by team caper films. He said, "This is the Star Wars version of Ocean's 11. In fact, my original title was Solo's 11, but they decided that might be a little too close to the trademark."

References

External links
 
 

2013 American novels
2013 science fiction novels
American science fiction novels
Star Wars Legends novels
Del Rey books